Calliostoma fonki is a species of sea snail, a marine gastropod mollusk in the family Calliostomatidae.

Description
The size of the shell varies between 11 mm and 17 mm. The imperforate, thin shell has a conical shape. it is pale rose colored. The upper whorls are plane, and tricingulate. The upper cingulus is beaded, the second and the third are smooth. The body whorl is obtusely angled and encircled by 5 cinguli. The base of the shell is a little convex, with 6 cinguli. The aperture is quadrangular. The columella is a little oblique, cylindrical, scarcely truncate, but sensibly passing into the base.

Distribution
This species occurs in the Pacific Ocean between El Salvador and Peru (not in the Galapagos Islands)

References

External links
 To Biodiversity Heritage Library (2 publications)
 To Encyclopedia of Life
 To World Register of Marine Species
 

fonki
Gastropods described in 1860